Bergheim (Ripuarian: Berchem) is a German town, some twenty km west of Cologne and the capital of the Rhein-Erft-Kreis (district). The town's Niederaußem district is one of the most important suppliers for energy from lignites in Europe.

Geography

Bergheim is about 20 km west of Cologne, approximately 72 metres above sea level. Its highest point is the Glessener Höhe (Glessen Height) at 204 metres. The Erft River flows through Bergheim. The town lies in the Zülpicher Börde, which belongs to the Kölner Bucht. Economically and geographically Bergheim is in the Rhenish lignite coalfield.

History
There is a burial hill in Niederaußem, dating from about 4000 BC. Romans settled in Bergheim around 50 BC. They constructed the major Roman road, the Via Belgica, that crossed the area where Bergheim is today. Later the Franks took control over the region. In the Middle Ages, Bergheim was granted city rights and later became part of the County of Jülich. In the 19th and 20th centuries Bergheim grew rapidly through the settlement of industry based on the local lignite coal. In World War II, the Wesseling synthetic oil plant was bombed during the Oil Campaign of World War II. Then in April 1944, a large underground plant for synthetic oil manufactured from lignite was set up outside Bergheim.

Districts

 Ahe
 Auenheim
 Bergheim-Mitte
 Büsdorf
 Fliesteden
 Glesch
 Glessen
 Kenten
 Niederaußem
 Oberaußem
 Paffendorf
 Quadrath-Ichendorf
 Rheidt-Hüchelhoven
 Thorr
 Zieverich

Points of interest
Points of interest are the Niederaussem Power Station with the world's tallest cooling tower as well as the Kottenforst-Ville Nature Park.

Notable people
 Gerhard Fieseler (1896–1987), fighter pilot in the First World War and aircraft constructor (Gerhard-Fieseler-Werke)
 Günter Grass (1927–2015), writer, Nobel Prize 1999, lived in Bergheim-Oberaussem for several years after the end of the World War II
 Sarah Kreuz (born 1989), singer, second place with DSDS
 The footballer Lukas Podolski grew up in Bergheim, played in the youth team of FC Jugend 07 Bergheim from 1991 onwards. In 1995 he changed to the D-youth of the 1. FC Köln 
 Michael Schumacher (born 1969), Formula 1 racing driver and seven-time world champion, attended the Geschwister-Scholl-Realschule in Bergheim 
 Lukas Sinkiewicz (born 1985), footballer
 Victoria Ulbrich (born 1992), singer and former band member of Queensberry

Twin towns – sister cities

Datteln is twinned with:
 Andenne, Belgium
 Chauny, France

References

http://www.wiktorp.cku.szkola.pl/Bergheim/Bergheim.htm

Rhein-Erft-Kreis